Naima Akter (born 7 February 1999) is a Bangladeshi swimmer. She competed in the women's 50 metre backstroke event at the 2018 FINA World Swimming Championships (25 m), in Hangzhou, China.

References

1999 births
Living people
Bangladeshi female swimmers
Female backstroke swimmers
Place of birth missing (living people)
South Asian Games bronze medalists for Bangladesh
South Asian Games medalists in swimming